Ove Nielsen (15 November 1924 – 2008) was a Danish rower. He competed at the 1952 Summer Olympics in Helsinki with the men's coxed four where they were eliminated in the semi-final repêchage.

Nielsen later moved to Lillehammer in Norway where he owned the Bellevue guest house for many years. During the 1994 Winter Olympics, he offered rooms for free in contrast to other local hotels that asked for premium prices. From the proceeds of selling his guest house, he bought the old ferry Mjøshfergen in 2006 to convert it into a restaurant. Two years later, he sold the ferry to a restaurateur.

References

1924 births
2008 deaths
Danish male rowers
Olympic rowers of Denmark
Rowers at the 1952 Summer Olympics
Sportspeople from Lillehammer
European Rowing Championships medalists